Just Family is the third studio album by American jazz singer Dee Dee Bridgewater. The album reached No. 13 on the Billboard Top Jazz Albums chart.

Reception
Andy Kellman of Allmusic noted "Neither 1977's Just Family nor 1979's Bad for Me can be considered Dee Dee Bridgewater's best work, but fans of mature, mid- to late-'70s R&B should find them moderately appealing. Though Bridgewater would not really hit her stride until her return to jazz in the '90s, she was more than competent when it came to fitting in with the likes of Phyllis Hyman, Patrice Rushen, Minnie Riperton, and Patti Austin."

Track listing

Personnel
Dee Dee Bridgewater – vocals
Stanley Clarke – arranger, bass, producer
Chick Corea – keyboards
George Duke – keyboards
Ray Gomez – guitar
Alphonso Johnson – bass
Harvey Mason, Sr. – drums
Airto Moreira – percussion
Scarlet Rivera – violin
David T. Walker – guitar

Charts

References

External links 

1977 albums
Dee Dee Bridgewater albums
Albums produced by Stanley Clarke
Elektra Records albums